Killa may refer to:

Places
Killa, Tripura, India
Killa, a village in Degana, Rajahsthan, India
Qila, sometimes spelt Killa, an element in placenames in South Asia
Killa (Aeolis), a town of ancient Aeolis

Music
Emis Killa, Italian rapper
"Killa" (Cherish song), 2007
"Killa", a 2004 song by Way Out West from Don't Look Now
"Killa", a 2010 song by Lecrae from Rehab
"Killa", a song by NEFFEX

Other uses
 Killa (film), a 2015 Marathi language film
 Mama Killa ("Mother Moon"), a Quechua moon goddess
 Kilian "Killa" Elkinson (born 1990), Bermudian footballer

See also 
 Killas, a type of rock of southwestern England
 Killah (disambiguation)
 Killer (disambiguation)